P'tit Basque is a cheese that was introduced in 1997, and was created by the French dairy giant Lactalis. P'tit Basque is made with pasteurized sheep's milk and is aged 70 days. It is covered in a thin light brown rind that has a basket weave pattern that was created in the curd pressing process, and then is covered in plastic wrap to prevent molding. It has a fat content of 45%.
 
P'tit Basque is a medium-firm cheese with a pungent smell and a mild flavor for a sheep's milk cheese.

References

French cheeses
Sheep's-milk cheeses